Palaiseau – Villebon is one of the four RER B stations of Palaiseau, near Paris, France.

Réseau Express Régional stations
Railway stations in Essonne
Railway stations in France opened in 1854